The Torre Reforma is a skyscraper in Mexico City with a height of  to the roof and housing 57 stories, in 2016 it became the tallest skyscraper in Mexico City, exceeding both Torre BBVA Bancomer at  located just across the street, and Torre Mayor at  located next to it.

Construction began in May 2008. The complex hosts a restaurant, a shopping mall, entertainment areas and the DOOM International's Reforma Gym. The construction of the building was managed by Vertical Capital Group while LBR and Architects was charge of development.

Construction
It was built at Paseo de la Reforma #483, across the street from the Torre Mayor, at the site formerly occupied by a nightclub on the Paseo de la Reforma. The initial plan included the demolishing of a historic 1930s house near the site, but it was decided to conserve the house and use the historic structure as the main entrance to the building.

Description
The building contains 45,000 m2 of office space, 2,500 m2 of retail space and 2,500 m2 of gym space. It has 28 lifts (elevators)  reaching a maximum speed of 6.8 meters per second. It will be along with the World Trade Center in Mexico City as the building with most elevators in Latin America. The tower will feature an underground parking garage with a capacity of 1,161 vehicles. In 2016 Torre Reforma achieved LEED Platinum certification.

As Torre Mayor and Torre Reforma are only a few steps away from each other, Chilango entertainment magazine dubbed them the non-twin towers.

See also
List of tallest buildings in Mexico City
List of tallest buildings in Mexico

References

External links

Official Site Torre Reforma
Skyscraperpage (Torre Reforma)
Emporis (Torre Reforma)
Engineering by ARUP (Torre Reforma)

Skyscraper office buildings in Mexico City
Cuauhtémoc, Mexico City
Paseo de la Reforma
Office buildings completed in 2016